was a Japanese shōnen manga magazine, published by Jive. The first issue was published on January 26, 2004, and the final issue on January 26, 2011. The magazine was sold monthly on the twenty-sixth. Afterwards it switched to an online-only publication until its close of service on March 31, 2014.

List of serialized titles
Aku no meshitsukai
Aoi Shiro - Kaeishō
Busin 0: Wizardry Alternative NEO
Casshern Sins
Clannad
Coyote Ragtime Show
Crows Yard
Dream Club
Full Contact
Galaxy Angel
Guin Saga
Happy Seven
Hatsune Miku: Unofficial Hatsune Mix
Holy Hearts!
Howling
I.B.S.S. Ice Blue Silver Sky
Kanimiso
Kaprekar
Kuwagata Tsumami
Mitsurugi: The Legend of School Revolution
My Dearest Devil Princess
Neppu Kairiku Bushi Road - The Rising
Nerima Daikon Brothers
Nui!
Ojīchan wa Shōnen Tantei
Orange Delivery
Ramen No Tori Paco-chan
Sakura no Neko Hime
Shinakoi
Shinyaku Ōkami ga Kuru!
Silent Blade
Sora no Kanatano!
Sotsugyō
Tona-Gura!

External links
 

2004 establishments in Japan
2011 disestablishments in Japan
Defunct magazines published in Japan
 Comic Rush
Magazines established in 2004
Magazines disestablished in 2011
Magazines published in Tokyo
Monthly manga magazines published in Japan
Shōnen manga magazines
Online magazines with defunct print editions